Neodyscrasis is a genus of fly in the family Ulidiidae.

Species
Neodyscrasis steyskali Hernández-Ortiz, 1988

Distribution
Mexico.

References

Ulidiidae
Monotypic Brachycera genera
Endemic insects of Mexico
Diptera of North America
Brachycera genera